Hartmann Lauterbacher (24 May 1909 – 12 April 1988) was a senior regional leader (Obergebietsführer) of the Hitler Jugend, as well as Gauleiter of Gau South Hanover–Brunswick (Südhannover-Braunschweig) and an SS-Obergruppenführer.

A veterinarian's son, he went to the Reformgymnasium in Kufstein and eventually learnt to be a druggist.

NSDAP membership
Already by 1923, the then 14-year-old Hartmann Lauterbacher had become a member of the Austria-based NSDAP's youth organization. It is even said that Lauterbacher founded the first ever NSDAP youth local in Austria, in Kufstein. In 1925, when he was 16 years old, Lauterbacher was the leader of the Deutsche Jugend ("German Youth"), which he transferred to the Hitler Youth in 1927.

Hitler Youth leader
For professional reasons, Lauterbacher had to move to Braunschweig, where he joined the NSDAP in September 1927. Between 1929 and 1930, he attended the Braunschweig Druggists' Academy. From 1929 to 1932 he led the Hitler Youth of the Gau of South Hanover–Brunswick, as of 1930 as his main job.

Between 1932 and 1933, Lauterbacher was appointed leader of the Westphalia-Lower Rhine area, and between 1933 and 1934 he was appointed high area leader of the Hitler Youth West.

On 22 May 1934, Baldur von Schirach appointed Lauterbacher his deputy and Stabsführer. In 1936, Lauterbacher was elected as a member of the Reichstag. In April 1937 he was made a Ministerial Councilor to Schirach.

Second World War
While von Schirach was away performing a short stint in the military, Lauterbacher took over the Hitler Youth's commissary leadership. When he likewise found himself having to spend a few weeks at military service, in the shape of an SS formation, he suffered an accident and was wounded badly enough to make deployment anywhere other than on the homefront quite impossible.

However, since a Hitler Youth leader could not show any sign of physical flaw or marring, Lauterbacher had to hand his position over to Artur Axmann, who now became Baldur von Schirach's deputy. Helmut Möckel became Stabsführer.

Gauleiter of South Hanover–Brunswick
On 8 August 1940, Lauterbacher was appointed Deputy Gauleiter of Gau South Hanover–Brunswick, and on 8 December 1940, as Science and Education Minister Bernhard Rust's successor, he was appointed full-fledged Gauleiter. At the same time he received an appointment as Honorary Leader of the Academy for Youth Leadership in Braunschweig

In January 1941, Lauterbacher was appointed to the Prussian State Council. He took over as Oberpräsident of the Prussian Province of Hanover on 1 April 1941 as SA Chief of Staff Viktor Lutze's successor. As Gauleiter and Oberpräsident, he thus united under his control the highest party and governmental offices in the province. At about the same time came his promotion to SS-Gruppenführer. Lauterbacher's last new assignment came on 16 November 1942, when he was appointed Reich Defense Commissioner for his Gau. On 30 January 1944, he was promoted to SS-Obergruppenführer.

On 10 April 1945, shortly before the Allied forces marched into Germany, and only 20 days before Adolf Hitler killed himself, Lauterbacher took his family to safety in the Harz, but not without having announced over wired radio the requisite exhortations to hold out against the onslaught. Two days earlier, on 8 April, he had loaded his car up with cigarettes so that he could flee south from the Harz posing as a cigarette sales agent. Leaving his family in the Harz on 11 April, after making it as far as Carinthia, Lauterbacher was seized and taken prisoner by the British on 26 May.

Post war

Internment, acquittal, and escape
Early in July 1946, the High British Military Court in Hanover acquitted Lauterbacher of the charge of having ordered early in April 1945 the murder of German and Allied detainees at the prison in Hamelin.

In August 1947, new proceedings against Lauterbacher began at the Dachau International Military Tribunal. At issue this time was an order allegedly given by Lauterbacher in September 1944 for the shooting of twelve American airman who had been shot down over Goslar. In October 1947, this trial, too, ended in acquittal.

Lauterbacher, who since the end of the war had been interned in the Sandbostel camp near Bremervörde, managed on 25 February 1948 to flee detention owing to circumstances that are still unclear.

Ratlines
He went underground, until he was arrested in Rome in April 1950. Here he was dealing with people smugglers who took people from former fascist states with warrants or charges outstanding against them to South America or the Middle East.

Sent to the La Frachette camp near Rome by the Italians, who had declared him an "undesirable foreigner", Lauterbacher still managed to flee a few months later, in December 1950, to Argentina, following the same route Adolf Eichmann took the same year. In Buenos Aires he helped develop ratlines for other Nazis seeking to flee from Europe.

Anti-Israel activities
From there he went to Egypt with the assistance of the CIA and West German intelligence to train anti-Israel guerrillas.

Later life
He was reported by the police in Munich on 4 September 1956. As more intensive investigations got underway, Lauterbacher once more went underground, this time, though, without leaving any trail.

In the early 1980s it came to light that between 1977 and 1979, Lauterbacher had been working as an adviser in the Omani Ministry of Youth. The last few years of his life he spent very reclusively in Germany. Only his death certificate establishes that he died in Seebruck.

Hartmann Lauterbacher, Baldur von Schirach's deputy, was said to be the organizational talent and the active element of the Reich Youth Leadership. As Gauleiter and High President in Hanover, he bore a great deal of the responsibility for stripping Jews of their rights and deporting them.

German justice, which had already begun proceedings through the Hanover prosecutor's office in 1947, later followed by investigative proceedings in Munich and Hanover, contented itself, however, to discontinue the investigation owing to lapse of time.

The suspicion keeps arising that Hartmann Lauterbacher was active in the Allied secret service, and the Gehlen Organization.

References

Bibliography

External links
Photo of Hartmann Lauterbacher
 

1909 births
1988 deaths
Austrian politicians
Nazi Party officials
Gauleiters
SS-Obergruppenführer
Holocaust perpetrators in Germany
Austrian Nazis
Members of the Reichstag of Nazi Germany
People acquitted of murder
Federal Intelligence Service informants
Hitler Youth members